The Bulgarian National Badminton Championships is a tournament organized to crown the best badminton players in Bulgaria. They are held since 1985. The same year the junior championships and the Bulgarian International started.

Past winners

Junior champions

References

External links
Badminton Europe - Details of affiliated national organisations
Bulgarian Badminton Federation - Results

Badminton tournaments in Bulgaria
National badminton championships
Recurring sporting events established in 1985
Badminton
1985 establishments in Bulgaria